Dion Joseph Weisler (born 20 August 1967) is an Australian-born businessman, and was the chief executive officer and president of HP Inc. from November 2015, when HP Inc. and Hewlett Packard Enterprise split into separate companies, to November 2019.

Weisler has a bachelor's degree in computing from Monash University. He is married with two children, and lives in Palo Alto, California. Weisler is a pilot who owns and flies a Pilatus PC-12.

On November 1, 2019, Weisler stepped down as chief executive officer and president of HP Inc due to "a family health matter".

References

1967 births
Living people
People from Palo Alto, California
Monash University alumni
American chief executives of Fortune 500 companies
Hewlett-Packard people
Australian expatriates in the United States